Dan Frankel may refer to:

Dan Frankel (British politician) (1900–1988), MP for Mile End, 1935–1945
Dan Frankel (American politician) (born 1956), member of the Pennsylvania House of Representatives